Lugal-kitun was the 12th and last lugal of the first Dynasty of Uruk. He ruled in Mesopotamia in modern-day Iraq. Little is known about Lugal-kitun.

According to the Sumerian King List, he reigned  for 36 years. Lugal-kitun was overthrown by Mesannepada of Ur, ending the First Dynasty of Uruk and founding the First Dynasty of Ur.

See also

History of Sumer

|-

References

Sumerian kings
26th-century BC Sumerian kings
Kings of Uruk